The names of the Celtic Iron Age tribes in Britain were recorded by Roman and Greek historians and geographers, especially Ptolemy. Information from the distribution of Celtic coins has also shed light on the extents of the territories of the various groups that occupied the island.

Historiography 

The following ethnic names were recorded in the 2nd century CE at the earliest. Technically, the Iron Age had ended by this date, having transitioned into the Roman period. These tribes were not necessarily the same tribes that had been living in the same area during the Iron Age. Available evidence seems to indicate that the tribes of the Middle Iron Age tended to group together into larger tribal kingdoms during the Late Iron Age.

The Belgae and Atrebates share their names with tribes in France and Belgium, which, together with Caesar's note that Diviciacus of the Suessiones had ruled territory in Britain, suggests that this part of the country might have been conquered and ruled from abroad. The Parisii have also been suggested as having been an immigrant group.

Some historians have suggested that it might be possible to distinguish the distributions of different tribes from their pottery assemblages for the Middle Iron Age. However, no names are available for these tribes (except perhaps "Pretanoi"), and most of the tribes apart from in the South did not use pottery to a significant enough extent for this methodology to be applied to them.

These are also not necessarily the names by which the tribes knew themselves; for instance, "Durotriges" can mean "hillfort-dwellers", referring to the fact that hillforts continued to be occupied in this area after they were abandoned elsewhere in Southern Britain. It is unlikely that the Durotriges themselves considered this their defining characteristic. Further, "Regnenses" is a Latin name meaning "inhabitants of the (client) kingdom".

Southern Britain

Atrebates
Belgae
Cantiaci
Catuvellauni
Dobunni
Dumnonii, and sub-tribe Cornovii
Durotriges
Regnenses
Trinovantes
Iceni

Middle of Britain
Carvetii
Cornovii
Corieltauvi
Parisi

Northern Britain
Brigantes
Caledonii
Caereni
Carnonacae
Corionototae
Creones
Damnonii
Decantae
Epidii
Lopocares
Lugi
Novantae
Selgovae
Smertae
Setantii
Taexali
Textoverdi
Vacomagi
Venicones
Votadini

Western Britain
Deceangli
Demetae
Gangani
Ordovices
Silures

Miscellaneous (unknown)
Ancalites
Attacotti
Bibroci
Cassi
Cenimagni (= Iceni?)
Pretanoi (= Britons, or refers to a single tribe?)
Segontiaci

See also 
 Roman client kingdoms in Britain

References

Bibliography
Anon (1994). Historical Map and Guide Roman Britain (map). Ordnance Survey, Fourth Edition (Revised).
Frere, S. (1987). Britannia. Routledge, London.

External links

Britain